Sinhasa is a census town in Indore district in the Indian state of Madhya Pradesh.

Demographics
 India census, Sinhasa had a population of 4,079. Males constitute 54% of the population and females 46%. Sinhasa has an average literacy rate of 41%, lower than the national average of 59.5%: male literacy is 52%, and female literacy is 28%. In Sinhasa, 18% of the population is under 6 years of age.

References

Cities and towns in Indore district